James Lauf (born November 1, 1927) is an American cyclist. He competed in the 4,000 metres team pursuit at the 1952 Summer Olympics.

References

1927 births
Living people
American male cyclists
Olympic cyclists of the United States
Cyclists at the 1952 Summer Olympics
Sportspeople from Baltimore
American track cyclists